The 1999–2000 BCAFL was the 15th full season of the British Collegiate American Football League, organised by the British Students American Football Association.

Changes from last season
Division Changes
There were no changes to the Divisional lineup

Team Changes
University of Dundee joined the Northern Conference, as the Bluedevils
Sunderland Wearwolves withdrew after seven seasons
This meant the number of teams in BCAFL stayed at 27.

Regular season

Northern Conference, Scottish Division

Northern Conference, Eastern Division

Northern Conference, Central Division

Southern Conference, Eastern Division

Southern Conference, Central Division

Southern Conference, Western Division

Playoffs

Note – the table does not indicate who played home or away in each fixture.

References

External links
 Official BUAFL Website
 Official BAFA Website

1999
1999 in British sport
2000 in British sport
1999 in American football
2000 in American football